William Snodgrass may refer to:

W. D. Snodgrass (William De Witt Snodgrass, 1926–2009), American poet
William Davis Snodgrass (1796–1886), American Presbyterian minister
William R. Snodgrass (1922–2008), Tennessee Comptroller of the Treasury
William Snodgrass (minister) (1827–1906), Canadian Presbyterian minister and the sixth Principal of Queen's College, now Queen's University
William Snodgrass (politician) (1870–1939), politician from Nelson, New Zealand